Elachiptereicus is a genus of fruit flies in the family Chloropidae. There are about seven described species in Elachiptereicus.

Species
These seven species belong to the genus Elachiptereicus:
 Elachiptereicus abessynicus Becker, 1913 c g
 Elachiptereicus angustigena Sabrosky, 1951 c g
 Elachiptereicus australiensis Ismay, 1996 c g
 Elachiptereicus bistriatus Becker, 1909 c g
 Elachiptereicus dorsocentralis Becker, 1911 g
 Elachiptereicus italicus Duda, 1933 c g
 Elachiptereicus japonicus Kanmiya, 1987 c g
Data sources: i = ITIS, c = Catalogue of Life, g = GBIF, b = Bugguide.net

References

Further reading

External links

 

Chloropinae
Chloropidae genera